The Río María Linda is a river in southwest Guatemala. Its sources are located south of Lake Amatitlán in the department of Guatemala. It flows southwards through the coastal lowlands of Escuintla and Santa Rosa to the Pacific Ocean.

References

Rivers of Guatemala